Tongzi is a county under the administration of the prefecture-level city of Zunyi, in the north of Guizhou province, China, bordering Chongqing to the north.

The county government is located in the town of Loushanguan.

Transportation

Rail 
Chuanqian Railway
Chongqing–Guiyang high-speed railway

Roads 
Chongzun Expressway
China National Highway 210
China National Highway 050

Climate

References

External links
Official website of Tongzi Government

County-level divisions of Guizhou
Zunyi